Morchella herediana is a species of ascomycete fungus in the family Morchellaceae. Described as new to science in 1971 by Luis Diego Gómez, it is found in Costa Rica.

References

External links

herediana
Edible fungi
Fungi described in 1971
Fungi of Central America